The Hilton London Hyde Park is a hotel on Bayswater Road, overlooking Hyde Park and Kensington Gardens in Central London. It was opened in July 1999.

The building was originally called the Coburg Court Hotel. The Coburg Court Hotel first opened in 1907. It was later renamed the Coburg Hotel in the early 1960s.

The Coburg Hotel was used as a filming location in Alfred Hitchcock's Frenzy (1972). Richard Blaney and Babs Milligan check into the Coburg as "Mr. and Mrs. Oscar Wilde." Filming took place at the hotel in September 1971.  The interiors of the Coburg Hotel were mostly recreated at Pinewood Studios, except for the policemen's point-of-view shot showing the fire escape, which was filmed by assistant director Colin M. Brewer from a fifth-floor room.

See also
Hotels in London
London Hilton on Park Lane

References

External links
 Official Website of Hilton London Hyde Park

London Hyde Park
Hotels in the City of Westminster
Hotel buildings completed in 1907
Hotels established in 1907